Miss (pronounced ) is an English language honorific typically used for a girl, for an unmarried woman (when not using another title such as "Doctor" or "Dame"), or for a married woman retaining her maiden name. Originating in the 17th century, it is a contraction of mistress. Its counterparts are Mrs., used for a married women who has taken her husband's name, and Ms., which can be used for married or unmarried women.

The plural Misses may be used, such as in The Misses Doe. The traditional French "Mademoiselle" (abbreviation "Mlle") may also be used as the plural in English language conversation or correspondence. In Australian, British, and Irish schools the term 'miss' is often used by pupils in addressing any female teacher.

Use alone as a form of address 
Miss is an honorific for addressing a woman who is not married, and is known by her maiden name. It is a shortened form of mistress, and departed from misses/missus which became used to signify marital attachment in the 18th and 19th centuries. It does not imply age, though youth corresponds (as marriage implies adulthood).

Racial discrimination and the term Miss 
Being addressed with "Miss" or "Mrs." was frequently denied to black women in the Southern United States in the past. Mary Hamilton, a civil rights protester arrested in 1963 in Gadsden, Alabama, refused to answer the prosecutor in a subsequent hearing unless he stopped addressing her as "Mary", demanding that instead she be called "Miss Hamilton". She was subsequently jailed for contempt of court after refusing to pay a fine. This led to Hamilton v. Alabama, 376 U.S. 650 (1964), a United States Supreme Court case in which the court held that Mary Hamilton was entitled to the same courteous forms of address customarily reserved solely for whites in the Southern United States and that calling a black person by their first name in a formal context was "a form of racial discrimination".

See also
 Fräulein (German-language term for Miss, gained popularity due to the Fräuleinwunder, lit. Miracle of the Miss)

References

Women's social titles
Honorifics
Titles